Đorđe Jovanović (Serbian Cyrillic: Ђорђе Јовановић; 27 October 1909 – 23 July 1943) was a Serbian literary critic and Surrealist poet and writer during the interwar period. Along with his two high school classmates, Oskar Davičo and Đorđe Kostić, Jovanović represented the younger generation of the Yugoslav Surrealist movement.

Jovanović was often referred to by his nickname Jarac (billy goat).

Early life
Đorđe Jovanović was born on 27 October 1909 in Belgrade. He was the son of Jovan "Kalča" and Danka Jovanović. Đorđe's father was a colonel.

Đorđe Jovanović became friends with his classmate and future co-author Đorđe Kostić around 1920, when they discussed the expulsion of a mutual classmate for spreading communist literature during Filip Filipović's mayoral campaign. The two initially bonded over their shared admiration for Miroslav Krleža and August Cesarec. Along with another classmate, Oskar Davičo, Kostić and Jovanović would go on to represent the younger generation of the Yugoslav Surrealist movement. Before joining the core of the local movement in 1930, the group would publish several literary magazines during their high school years.

The group's first foray into publishing was the single-issue magazine Okna (Panes), published in 1925 and edited by Jovanović. Okna featured the first published prose of Oskar Davičo. In 1926, Jovanović and Kostić, alongside Filip Vasić and Božidar Z. Marković, published the magazine Stišavanja (Becalmings). The magazine was inspired by the writings of Robert Desnos, and included a translation of his poetry. It also featured Jovanović's critical essays on Ljubomir Micić, Stanislav Vinaver, Aleksandar Vučo, Rade Drainac and others, as well as an innovative short story by Jovanović titled "A Castle neither in the Sky nor on Earth (Composed According to the Words of the Vagabond Njegovan)". Filip Vasić provided the illustrations for Stišavanja.

Around this time, Jovanović was expelled from the First Belgrade Gymnasium for refusing to obey the dress code. He transferred to the Fourth Belgrade Gymnasium where he would meet Dušan Matić, one of his teachers at the time. According to Đorđe Kostić, it was during this time that Jovanović struggled with alcoholism, started abusing ether and developed a personal ethic of being "lifelike", eschewing nonconformism and adopting a hedonistic attitude. Because of all this, the two drifted apart for a short while. They reconnected in the autumn of 1927, when Jovanović introduced his former classmate to Matić. Soon after, Jovanović enrolled at the University of Belgrade to study philosophy. In 1928, Jovanović introduced Matić to Oskar Davičo, who took an instant liking to him after discussing their shared disdain for mainstream poets like Jovan Dučić and Milan Rakić, as well as the literary critic Bogdan Popović.

Between 1928 and 1929, Jovanović and Kostić, together with Davičo, published three issues of the literary magazine Tragovi (Traces). The magazine was intentionally limited to an exceptionally small circulation, namely only eight copies of each issue were printed. The readers were mostly known in advance and belonged to the Surrealist group, to whom Tragovi would serve as a short anthology presenting the styles of the three collaborators. During his work on Tragovi, Jovanović was enamored with the Bonnot Gang and frequently discussed the idea that each excess could represent an affirmation of freedom.

During 1928, Jovanović was briefly married to a girl in Skopje, in accordance with the wishes of his father. The couple had a baby girl, and agreed to a divorce almost instantly.

Surrealist movement
On 30 November 1929, in the apartment of Aleksandar Vučo, the Belgrade Surrealist group was officially formed. Jovanović attended the meeting organized by Vučo and Marko Ristić, where he got into a scuffle with Velibor Gligorić. In early 1930, Jovanović, Kostić and Davičo published their final project together, the experimental single-issue placard magazine Četiri strane – Onanizam smrti – I tako dalje (Four Pages – Onanism of Death – And So On). The publication is sometimes considered a series of posters because of its innovative typographic design.

In May 1930, the first Surrealist almanac the group authored was published under the name Nemoguće (The Impossible), with an introduction written by Ristić and Matić. In October, the Surrealist group got into several physical confrontations with Rade Drainac after the publishing of his openly disdainful and derogatory article on the group in the magazine Pravda. According to Drainac, he was beaten by the entire group. However, according to Đorđe Kostić, Drainac got into a short scuffle with Jovanović and himself, during which Jovanović grabbed Drainac by the coat and Kostić blocked his arm when he swung at them with a walking stick. Kostić claimed that Radojica Živanović Noe beat Drainac only later that night in a one-on-one fight near Hotel Moskva. Several members of the group signed an announcement outlining a similar story in late October.

In January 1931, the group published the declaration Pozicija nadrealizma (The Position of Surrealism) where they stated their support for a socialist revolution. The declaration was later banned. In June 1931, the group published the review Nadrealizam danas i ovde (Surrealism Here and Now). The review signed 11 editors, with Jovanović signed as editor in chief. The review would continue until June 1932.

Jovanović was arrested on 1 December 1932 along with fellow Surrealist Koča Popović, and was indicted for reproducing and distributing communist leaflets at the University of Belgrade. After a five-day trial, on 17 June 1933 he was sentenced to three years of rigorous imprisonment by the National Court for the Protection of the State, set up during the 6 January Dictatorship. Đorđe served his sentence at the Sremska Mitrovica Prison. His arrest was preceded by the sentencing of Oskar Davičo to five years of prison several days before.

After his release from prison, Jovanović drifted from Surrealism, as the movement lost favor with the Communist Party of Yugoslavia. The former Surrealist group split into two sections, with one section, including Davičo, Kostić, Matić and Jovanović, making the gradual transition to socialist realism or social literature. During these years, Jovanović became a contributor in Matić and Vučo's new magazine Naša stvarnost (Our Reality). He would often publish under the pseudonym Đorđe Daničić.

Final years and death
In 1941, Jovanović joined the Yugoslav Partisans. After their retreat from Serbia, Jovanović went back to Belgrade to join the Kosmaj Partisan Detachment. He became the political commissar of his detachment on 6 October 1941. In 1943, Jovanović wrote in the illegal magazine Glas (The Voice) under the pseudonym Danilo Dragić, denouncing writers from the Serbian Literary Guild and Kolarac Endowment who agreed to collaborate with the Nazi occupation.

Đorđe Jovanović was killed in Slatina near Kosmaj on 23 July 1943. A novel authored by him and several books of his essays were published posthumously. During the occupation, his corpse was displayed in the center of Sopot as a warning.

Legacy
The Stari Grad department of the Belgrade City Library carries the name of Đorđe Jovanović. Starting in 1967, the municipal library awards the annual "Đorđe Jovanović Award" for best critical essay.

Works
 (1948) Plati pa nosi (Pay, Then Carry), novel
 (1949) Studije i kritike (Studies and Critiques), essays
 (1951) Protiv obmana (Against Deceptions), essays
 (1979) Snebapaurebra (Outoftheblue), poetry

References

Sources
 
 
 
 
 
 

1909 births
1943 deaths
20th-century Serbian poets
20th-century Serbian writers
Serbian literary critics
Serbian male writers
Serbian surrealist writers
Yugoslav literary critics
Yugoslav Partisans members
Yugoslav poets